Salford Quays tram stop is a stop on Greater Manchester's light rail Metrolink system. It is located beside Salford Quays, on Metrolink's Eccles Line. It opened as part of Phase 2 of the system's expansion, on 12 June 1999.

Services

Service pattern
12 minute service to Etihad Campus (peak).
12 minute service to MediaCityUK (peak).
12 minute service to Eccles (via MediaCityUK at offpeak times).
12 minute service to Ashton-under-Lyne.

Connecting bus routes 
Salford Quays station is served by buses stopping nearby on Trafford Road. Services that stop nearby are Go North West Orbits 53, which runs to Pendleton and to Cheetham Hill via Rusholme, Gorton and Harpurhey and Diamond Bus North West service 79, which runs between Salford Shopping Centre and Stretford.

References

External links

Salford Quays Stop Information
Salford Quays area map

Tram stops in Salford
Tram stops on the Eccles to Piccadilly line
Tram stops on the MediaCityUK to Cornbrook line
Salford Quays